In the Name of the People is a 1985 American documentary film directed by Frank Christopher about the Salvadoran Civil War. The film follows four filmmakers who secretly entered El Salvador, marched with guerrillas across the country, and followed them into combat against government forces in San Salvador. It was nominated for an Academy Award for Best Documentary Feature.

References

External links

In the Name of the People at Icarus Films

1985 films
American documentary films
Documentary films about the Salvadoran Civil War
1985 documentary films
1980s English-language films
1980s American films